Bandolero! is a 1968 American Western film directed by Andrew V. McLaglen and starring James Stewart, Dean Martin, Raquel Welch and George Kennedy. The story centers on two brothers on the run from a posse, led by a local sheriff who wants to arrest the runaways and free a hostage that they took along the way. They head into the wrong territory, which is controlled by "Bandoleros".

Plot

Posing as a hangman, Mace Bishop arrives in the Texas town of Val Verde with the intention of freeing his brother Dee from the gallows. Dee and his gang have been arrested for a bank robbery in which Maria Stoner's husband was killed by gang member Babe Jenkins. After freeing his brother, Mace successfully robs the bank on his own after the gang has fled with the posse in pursuit.

Dee has taken Maria as a hostage after they come across her wagon, during which gang member Pop Chaney shoots and kills the man escorting Maria. The posse, led by local sheriff July Johnson and deputy Roscoe Bookbinder, chases the fugitives across the Mexican border into territory policed by bandoleros, whom Maria describes as men out to kill any gringos (foreigners) that they can find. Maria further warns Dee that the sheriff will follow, because they have taken the one thing that he has always wanted: her.

Despite initial protestations, Maria falls for Dee after he protects her from the others, and finds herself in a quandary. She had never felt anything for the sheriff, nor for her husband, who had purchased her from her family. The posse tracks them to an abandoned town and captures the gang. The bandoleros also arrive, shooting and killing Roscoe, so the sheriff releases the outlaws so that the men can fight back in defense.

In this final showdown, almost everyone is killed. Dee is fatally stabbed by the leader of the bandits, El Jefe, after Dee savagely beats him when he attempts to rape Maria. Then Mace is shot by another. Babe and gang member Robbie O'Hare die after killing several bandoleros. Pop Chaney is killed while going after the money Mace stole, and his son Joe dies after trying to rescue him. Maria grabs Dee's pistol and shoots El Jefe dead, sending the now leaderless bandoleros into full retreat. Maria professes her love to Dee and finally kisses him before he dies. Mace returns the money to sheriff Johnson, and then falls dead due to his wound. Maria and the sheriff, with little left of the posse, bury the Bishop brothers and dead posse members, after which Maria remarks that no one will know who was there. They then begin the ride back to Texas.

Cast
 James Stewart as Mace Bishop 
 Dean Martin as Dee Bishop 
 Raquel Welch as Maria Stoner 
 George Kennedy as Sheriff July Johnson 
 Andrew Prine as Deputy Sheriff Roscoe Bookbinder
 Will Geer as Pop Chaney
 Clint Ritchie as Babe Jenkins
 Denver Pyle as Muncie Carter 
 Tom Heaton as Joe Chaney 
 Rudy Diaz as Angel 
 Sean McClory as Robbie O'Hare
 Harry Carey, Jr. as Cort Hayjack (as Harry Carey)
 Don "Red" Barry as Jack Hawkins (as Donald Barry)
 Guy Raymond as Ossie Grimes
 Perry Lopez as Frisco 
 Jock Mahoney as Stoner 
 Dub Taylor as Attendant 
 Big John Hamilton as Bank Customer
 Robert Adler as Ross Harper (as Bob Adler)
 John Mitchum as Bath House Customer
 Patrick Cranshaw as Bank Clerk (as Joseph Patrick Cranshaw)
 Roy Barcroft as Bartender

Production
The film was originally known as Mace.

The film was shot at the Alamo Village, the movie set originally created for John Wayne's The Alamo. The Alamo Village is located north of Brackettville, Texas. The location closed in 2009 after remaining open to movie companies and the public since 1960. Parts of the film were also shot at Kanab Canyon and Glen Canyon in Utah.

Larry McMurtry, the author of the novel Lonesome Dove, reportedly paid homage to Bandolero! by using similar names for the characters in his book. Both tales begin near the Mexico border and involve bandoleros. Both have a sheriff named July Johnson and a deputy Roscoe who travel a great distance in search of a wanted criminal and the woman who has rejected the sheriff's love. Both stories have a charismatic outlaw named Dee, who is about to be hanged and who wins the love of the woman before he dies. In the Lonesome Dove miniseries, the main characters twice pass directly in front of the Alamo—or at least a set built to replicate the Alamo.

Raquel Welch later said of her performance, "No one is going to shout, 'Wow it's Anne Bancroft all over again', but at least I'm not Miss Sexpot running around half naked all the time."

"I think she's going to stack up all right", Stewart said of Welch.

Reception
Bandolero! earned North American rentals of $5.5 million in 1968.

According to Fox records the film required $10,200,000 in rentals to break even and by 11 December 1970 had made $8,800,000 so it was a loss for the studio.

Soundtrack
Jerry Goldsmith's score was released as an LP by Project 3 Records, and years later multiple times on CD. Because of Martin's exclusive contract with Reprise Records, all traces of him were removed from the cover, even the artwork, despite the album being strictly instrumental and his voice never being heard.

See also
 List of American films of 1968

References

External links

 
 
 
 
 
 

1968 films
1968 Western (genre) films
20th Century Fox films
American Western (genre) films
1960s English-language films
Films about capital punishment
Films directed by Andrew McLaglen
Films set in Mexico
Films shot in Texas
Films scored by Jerry Goldsmith
Films about brothers
Films shot in Utah
Revisionist Western (genre) films
1960s American films